Painted Skin may refer to:

"Painted Skin" (short story),  short story from Pu Songling's Strange Stories from a Chinese Studio
Painted Skin (1992 film), Hong Kong film directed by King Hu
Painted Skin (2008 film), Chinese film directed by Gordon Chan
Painted Skin: The Resurrection, 2012 Chinese film, sequel to the 2008 film
Painted Skin (TV series), 2011 Chinese television series
Painted Skin 2 (TV series), 2013 Chinese television series

See also
Body painting